The Isle of Man Green Party is a green political party in the Isle of Man founded in August 2016 by Andrew Langan-Newton, who still leads the party along with Deputy Leader, Lamara Craine. Success has been achieved at local authority level with the first seat won in a by-election in 2018 and today the party has 4 elected members on 4 different local authorities. The Party proposes that it provides a forum for citizens of the Isle of Man to build a movement seeking change and direction in Isle of Man politics.

The Isle of Man Green Party has adopted the six guiding principles of the Global Greens Charter;

 Ecological Wisdom
 Social Justice
 Participatory Democracy
 Non-Violence
 Sustainability
 Respect for Diversity

Although an independent party, not directly associated with the Green Parties of other countries such as Green Party of England and Wales, Scottish Greens or Green Party (Ireland), the party is a member of the Green Isles Alliance which is a panel of representatives of the Green Parties of the British Isles. The Isle of Man Green Party is one of four political parties on the Isle of Man which is typically a country where independent political candidates stand for election. The other three parties on the island are the Manx Labour Party, the Liberal Vannin Party and the Mec Vannin party.

The Party holds a number of events and conferences on a regular basis including, since 2018, an annual party conference which consists of an annual general meeting of the members of the party followed by a conference open to the general public and prospective members.

Electoral history

Local government

Two of the founding members of the Isle of Man Green Party were already members of local authorities when the party came into being. Andrew Jessopp, Chairman of Braddan Parish Commissioners, and Falk Horning, who won the 2016 by-election for Douglas's Murrays Ward with 226 votes.

The party first contested local authority elections in the summer 2018 with Daniel Webb in the Ramsey South by-election and then Andrew Bentley in the Douglas, Derby Ward, by-election. Andrew Bentley was the first Green Party candidate to be elected, winning a seat on the Douglas Borough Council.

In September 2019, Green Party candidate Leo Cussons contested the Malew local authority by-election, achieving 131 votes (or 11.4% of the total), missing out on winning a local parish commissioner seat.

The 2021 Local Authority General Elections were contested by 5 Green Party candidates. In Douglas Andrew Bentley topped the poll in East Ward with 551 votes while Falk Horning came second in North Ward with 385 votes  both were re-elected as councillors. In Castletown the Green Party candidate, Susan Rossouw, secured 188 votes, however this was not enough to be elected. Andrew Jessopp and Philip Matthews were both elected to the parish commissioners of Braddan and Patrick in uncontested elections.

In November 2021 deputy leader Lamara Craine received 406 votes in the Ramsey North Ward by-election to become the party's 5th local authority member.

House of Keys
The Isle of Man Green Party's first opportunity to contest a House of Keys election came in the 2020 Douglas South by-election where Andrew Jessopp, Chairman of Braddan Commissioners was the party's candidate. Although unsuccessful Jessopp received 342 votes and came fourth out of ten candidates.

The 2021 general election saw the party field candidates in two constituencies. Leo Cussons stood in Glenfaba & Peel and Andrew Langan-Newton, the Green Party leader, Rushen (constituency)

Elected representatives
The Isle of Man Green Party currently have 5 seats in local government.

Andrew Bentley and Falk Horning sit on Douglas Borough Council. First elected in 2016, Falk Horning has, since August 2021, chaired the Council's Environment & Services Committee and sits on the Executive Committee. 

Lamara Craine represents North Ward on Ramsey Town Commissioners.

Andrew Jessopp is Chairman of Braddan Parish Commissioners and is their representative on the Eastern Joint Civic Amenity Site Committee.

Party members
The Green Party has a number of politically active members who have been involved in local issues, campaigns and various direct action initiatives.

Andrew Langan-Newton, a consultant advocate from Port St Mary, has been elected as leader of the party every year since he founded it in 2016 and is standing in his first election for the House of Keys in 2021. Mr Langan-Newton was educated at Castle Rushen High School prior to attending Durhum University and law school in England.  In 2015, Andrew represented the Isle of Man at the Commonwealth Youth Parliament in Australia where he was elected Prime Minister of the Parliament. He returned to the island "recognising the opportunity and the need for a movement for change around sustainable issues" and therefore set about founding the Isle of Man Green Party. Mr Langan-Newton told Paul Moulton during an interview that he believes that science should lead politicians and politicians should take matters forward with regards to climate change. In 2019, Mr Langan-Newton criticised the Isle of Man Government's decision to introduce a new electric vehicle tax which he claimed was a 'retrograde step' and that the government should be encouraging the adoption of low carbon transport. Mr Langan-Newton identifies himself as being in the left of centre on the political spectrum and considers climate change, green energy and affordable housing to be some of his most important priorities.

Lamara Craine, Green Party Deputy Leader and (since November 2021) Ramsey Commissioner, is a local activist and community participant who organised several protests relating to climate change and environmental destruction on the Isle of Man. The most recent protest that Lamara Craine organised regarding the elm tree tunnel at St Mark's was attended by over 250 people and successfully halted the planned works.

Andrew Jessopp, Braddan Commissioner and founding member of the Isle of Man Green Party, was elected as a local politician in 2004, and has been retained as the Chair of the Commissioners since 2015. In July 2020, Mr Jessopp declared for the House of Keys by-election for Douglas South which took place on 27 August 2020. Mr Jessopp recently commented on a joint decision of five local authorities to invest in a new amenity site which would replace the current Eastern Civic Amenity Site. Andrew Jessopp is an active member and Chair of Zero Waste Mann, an Isle of Man charity which is tasked with reducing waste on the island. On Thursday 17 June 19th 2021, Mr Jessopp attended the opening ceremony of construction works to begin building a new local authority community facility at Strang Corner Field in Braddan which will be used as a sports hall, child nursery, and commissioners offices.

Leo Cussons is the Election Strategist for the Isle of Man Green Party who grew up on farms in Glen Maye. Manx born Mr Cussons, who currently lives in Peel, is a legally trained businessman with graduate and post graduate degrees in law and legal practice and currently the proprietor of Ken Quine's hardware shop in Port Erin. Mr Cussons returned to live on the Isle of Man in 2004 after working as an ERP computer consultant for 10 years in the Netherlands. Mr Cussons has been directly involved as a Green Party member for the last five years and has organised a number of public meetings around the island. He stated in an interview with Manx Radio that he believes that the young people of the island have more power than they realise and hopes that they will vote in all forthcoming elections.

Falk Horning, Green Party Douglas Borough Council member, originally from Germany, moved to the Isle of Man in 2009. Councillor Falk Horning has worked on behalf of Douglas Council to launch a Keep Britain Tidy campaign, 'Love Where You Live' in which involve volunteer groups, schools and local businesses would take part in community led schemes. Falk Horning is involved in a number of local environmental organisations.

 Chairperson of the Isle of Man Woodland Trust 
 Chair of Zero Waste Mann 
 Member of Isle of Man Friends of the Earth

Mr Horning is able to identify the native trees of the Isle of Man as he began planting trees at the age of 27. Mr Horning became a director of the IOM Woodland Trust in September 2016 and became chair in April 2018. In April 2021, the Isle of Man Woodland Trust launched its campaign to plant more trees in the Manx countryside, 'Plant It Forward'. Mr Horning, as Chairperson confirmed that the trust would be working with Ashgrove Marketing agency to bring about its campaign.

Andrew Bentley, an architect by trade and member of the steering group of the Isle of Man Climate Change Coalition, supported the Manx Blind Welfare Society during Vision Awareness Week 2019 with its campaign to introduce large print and braille menus at restaurants around Douglas town centre. In September 2020, Andrew Bentley as Douglas Councillor, supported the 'Plan Bee Initiative' by Douglas Council's regeneration and community committee whereby grassy areas have been allowed to grow to support bees, insects and other pollinators. In July 2020, Andrew embarked on the Plastic Free July challenge which takes a zero-tolerance approach to plastic in order to change perspective and ultimately, habits. Andrew Bentley and fellow party member and Douglas Councillor, Falk Horning, took action when public outcries were heard regarding the unclean condition of footbridge lamps. In 2018, Mr Bentley and Mr Horning attended the Green Party conference in Bristol and met with members of the Isle of Wight Green Party.

Party conferences

References 

Political parties in the Isle of Man
Political parties established in 2016
Green parties in Europe
2016 establishments in the Isle of Man